Santa Rosa City Schools are the combination of two school districts in Santa Rosa, California: the Santa Rosa Elementary School District (grades K-6) and the Santa Rosa High School District (grades 7–12). The combined districts have over 16,000 students in nine elementary schools, five middle schools, six high schools (including one alternative high school), one K-8 arts charter school, one 5-6 accelerated charter school, one Spanish language dual immersion charter school, one French language dual immersion charter school, and several child care programs. Eight other elementary school districts, Bellevue Union, Bennett Valley Union, Kenwood, Mark West Union, Piner-Olivet, Rincon Valley Union, Roseland Union, and Wright, feed into the high school district.

Schools 
List of some of the schools in the districts:
Albert F. Biella Elementary School
Brook Hill Elementary School
Luther Burbank Elementary School
Hidden Valley Elementary School
Helen Lehman Elementary School
Abraham Lincoln Elementary School
James Monroe Elementary School (see Monroe District)
Proctor Terrace Elementary School
Steele Lane Elementary School
Hilliard Comstock Middle School
Rincon Valley Middle School
Santa Rosa Middle School
Herbert Slater Middle School
Santa Rosa High School
Montgomery High School
Elsie Allen High School
Piner High School
Maria Carrillo High School
Ridgway High School (Continuation)
Santa Rosa Charter for the Arts (k-8) (Formerly Fremont Elementary School)
Santa Rosa Accelerated Charter School
Santa Rosa French-American Charter School
Cesar Chavez Language Academy

Administration 
The District is run by one board of education which is elected based on the High School District boundaries.  There are seven trustees, each elected for four-year terms.  Some are elected on the presidential election cycle and some are elected on the off-year cycle.  The trustee areas were created in late 2018 at which time the at-large election process was abandoned.

Elementary School Administration 

The Elementary School District is administered by the same board of education.  Two of the trustees are prohibited from residing in the Elementary District.  The other trustees may or may not live in the Elementary District.  The 2020-2022 Board has four trustees who do not live in the Elementary District and three trustees who live in the District.

See also
List of school districts in Sonoma County, California

References

External links 
 Santa Rosa City Schools
 Piner High School
 Santa Rosa High School
 Montgomery High School
 Maria Carrillo High School
 Rincon Valley Middle School
 Ridgway High School (Continuation)

School districts in Sonoma County, California
Education in Santa Rosa, California
Santa rosa